South Wasco County High School is a public high school in Maupin, Oregon, United States.

Academics
In 2008, 93% of the school's seniors received a high school diploma. Of 27 students, 25 graduated, none dropped out, and two were still in high school the following year.

References

High schools in Wasco County, Oregon
Public middle schools in Oregon
Public high schools in Oregon